Ranunculus circinatus is a species of flowering plant belonging to the family Ranunculaceae.

Its native range is Europe to Central Asia.

Synonym:
 Batrachium circinatum (Sibth.) Spach

References

circinatus